The Lautoka Jame Masjid is an Islamic mosque in Lautoka, Fiji.

The building has two floors and is known for its arched doors and white marble structure.

The former president of the Fiji Muslim League, Musa Vali Suleman Patel had served as imam of the mosque for over 25 years. He was later murdered in the Christchurch mosque shootings.

Prime Minister of New Zealand Jacinda Ardern visited the mosque in 2020 where she unveiled a plaque in honour of the three Fijians killed in the shooting as part of a ceremony.

See also 

 List of mosques in Fiji
 Islam in Fiji

References

External links 

 :hif:Lautoka Muslim Primary School (Fiji Hindi)

Marble buildings
Mosques in Fiji
Viti Levu